David Huang Shih-cho (born 14 August 1966) is a Taiwanese politician and scholar of public administration studies, who is currently running for the Mayor of Taoyuan election. He was the founding member of Taiwan Solidarity Union along with his father served as the chairman, but was lately left to join the Democratic Progressive Party for his political career in present.

Early life and career
David Huang was born to parents Huang Chu-wen and Huang Shu-ying. He earned a bachelor's degree in political science from Chinese Culture University before receiving a master's and doctoral degree from National Chengchi University and the University of Southern California, receptively. He subsequently taught at Tamkang University and the Kainan School of Management, then worked for the Examination Yuan. Huang also ran a consultancy firm.

Political career
Huang was a founding member of the Taiwan Solidarity Union, and his father the party's first chairman. David Huang was a member of the Examination Yuan until launching a legislative campaign representing Taipei in 2004. Despite Democratic Progressive Party incumbent Shen Fu-hsiung actively supporting another DPP candidate, Huang managed to win a seat on the Legislative Yuan. Following his election, Huang was made TSU caucus leader. Huang spent most of his term opposing initiatives that he believed would increase Chinese influence on Taiwan. Huang stated on 5 November 2007 that he would leave the TSU if it did not reinstate expelled members Liao Pen-yen and Huang Chung-yuan. Two days later, he withdrew from the party to participate in a Democratic Progressive Party primary, which he lost to Tuan Yi-kang. The TSU then rescinded support of Huang's 2008 campaign. Huang spent the remainder of his legislative term as an independent. After stepping down from the legislature, Huang served as vice president of Kainan University. Huang was named a Democratic Progressive Party candidate for Taoyuan in preparation for the 2012 elections, and later became a DPP spokesman.

References

1966 births
Living people
Chinese Culture University alumni
National Chengchi University alumni
University of Southern California alumni
Members of the 6th Legislative Yuan
Taipei Members of the Legislative Yuan
Taiwan Solidarity Union Members of the Legislative Yuan
Academic staff of Tamkang University
Taiwanese academic administrators